Edward Stevenson (1820–1897) was an American Mormon missionary.

Edward Stevenson may also refer to:

Edward Stevenson (costume designer) (1906–1968), American costume designer
Edward Stevenson (footballer) (1901–1977), Australian rules footballer
Edward Stevenson (Orange Order), Grand Master of the Orange Order since 2011
Edward A. Stevenson (1831–1895), American politician from Idaho
Edward A. Stevenson Sr. (1907–?), New York politician
Edward Irenaeus Prime-Stevenson (1858–1942), American author and homosexual advocate, also used the pseudonym Xavier Mayne

See also
Edward Stephenson (disambiguation)